Dixon Island, Dixson Island or Dikson Island and similar may refer to:

Dixon Island, Canada
Dixon Island (Western Australia) 
Dixson Island, Antarctica
Dikson Island, Russia